Chrysallactis aureorubra is a moth of the family Erebidae first described by George Hampson in 1900. It is found in New Guinea.

References

Moths described in 1900
Nudariina